Vanathi Srinivasan (/ʋaːnati/) is an Indian politician and a lawyer. As a lawyer, she has practiced in Madras High Court since 1993. She is a member of the Tamil Nadu Legislative Assembly from Coimbatore South constituency. She currently serves as the National President of the Women's Wing of the Bharatiya Janata Party.

Early life and education
Vanathi Srinivasan was born on 6 June 1970 to Kandasamy and Poovathal in Uliyampalayam Village near Thondamuthur block in Coimbatore.  She is the eldest child in her family and she has a brother named Shiva Kumar.
She did her schooling at Thondamuthur Higher Secondary School. She went on to pursue her UG program in Chemistry from PSG College of Arts and Science. She graduated from Dr. Ambedkar Government Law College, Chennai in 1993 and went on to achieve a master's degree in law from the University of Madras in the branch of International Constitution in 1995.

Career
Vanathi is a lawyer by profession. She started her professional career in 1993, working for Shri. B. S. Gnanadesikan, Senior Advocate (Formerly Tamil Nadu Congress Committee President). She has been practicing law in Chennai High Court for more than two decades. Vanathi was also a Standing Counsel for Southern Railway and Union Government, she was a former state secretary of BJP Tamil Nadu and also served as board member of Central Board of Film Certification. She contested in 2011 & 2016 Tamil Nadu State Assembly election as BJP candidate.

Political career
Vanathi Srinivasan's association with the BJP spans more than three decades. She has been a member of BJP since 1993 and has held various positions in the party since 1999. She was appointed a State Secretary of the BJP Tamil Nadu in 2013 and continued until 2014 when she was appointed the General Secretary of the BJP Tamil Nadu, a post she continued until June 2020 when she was elevated as the State Vice President of the BJP Tamil Nadu.  On 28 October 2020, Bharatiya Janata Party National President Jagat Prakash Nadda appointed Vanathi Srinivasan as the National President of the BJP Mahila Morcha.

2016 Assembly elections
Vanathi Srinivasan secured 33,113 votes in the Coimbatore South Assembly Election 2016.

2021 Assembly elections

She successfully contested the 2021 Tamil Nadu Legislative Assembly election from Coimbatore South constituency on a BJP ticket. She defeated actor Kamal Haasan of Makkal Needhi Maiam.

Elections contested

Personal life
Vanathi is married to Su. Srinivasan. They have two sons.

Legal cases 
The AIADMK filed criminal cases of assault on Vanathi Srinivasan and six other members including the Hindu Munnani district President T. Guna in Coimbatore during the state assembly campaigns of 2016. The Madras High court granted her an anticipatory bail for the case in August 2016.

Controversy

Disproportionate asset allegation 
Vanathi Srinivasan property values based on the affidavit of the 2011 state assembly elections were ₹1,16,59,891 and in the 2016 Tamil Nadu Legislative Assembly election her property value is ₹6,12,84,509 with shares from the company Zylog Systems, a company known for its alleged involvement in multi-crore stock market scams and bank frauds. In the five years (2011-2016) her assets increased by 525%. Her friend in the BJP, Sankara Narayanan and Balasubramaniya Adithyan claimed that these assets are gained by the Vanathi's family through corruption and misappropriation of their political power. They claimed that Srinivasan's brother, Shivakumar Kandhasamy who is the Vice President of the Company Zylog Systems, was brought inside the company earlier by Srinivasan to commit bank fraud and thus she became rich.  Zylog Systems India's founders are RSS members. Srinivasan said that they were family friends and that she had first provided legal advice to the company in exchange for 20,000 shares worth ₹1,000,000 to her family. Vanathi Srinivasan then denied any involvement with the company and stated that there was no proof to back up the allegations.

Tamil Nadu bifurcation proposal
Vanathi supports the idea of bifurcating Tamil Nadu to create a separate Kongu Nadu union territory.

Social activism
Vanathi founded Thamarai Shakthi Trust – an NGO working for Women Empowerment. She was the State Organiser for Sister Nivedita 150th Birth Anniversary Celebrations. Vanathi supported Asian games medallist Santhi Soundarajan's Justice for Santhi campaign to end the sex verification test for women in sports. She also initiated water conservation projects in Coimbatore to protect the local water bodies.

References

1970 births
Living people
Bharatiya Janata Party politicians from Tamil Nadu
Tamil Nadu MLAs 2021–2026
People from Coimbatore